Xinqiu District is a district of the city of Fuxin, Liaoning province, People's Republic of China.

Administrative divisions>
There are four subdistricts and one town within the district.

Subdistricts:
Jieji Subdistrict, Beibu Subdistrict, Zhongbu Subdistrict, Nanbu Subdistrict

The only town is Changyingzi

References

External links

County-level divisions of Liaoning